Glenn Antrum (born February 3, 1966) is a former American football wide receiver who played one season in the National Football League (NFL) for the New England Patriots. He played college football for UConn and went undrafted in 1989.

References

1966 births
New England Patriots players
Living people
American football wide receivers
UConn Huskies football players
Players of American football from Connecticut
People from Derby, Connecticut
People from Ansonia, Connecticut
Sportspeople from New Haven County, Connecticut